"Vart du än går" is a song by Swedish singer-songwriter Niklas Strömstedt from his fourth studio album, Om! (1990).

Commercial performance 

In Sweden, it reached number 13 and spent three weeks on the chart.

Track listing and formats 

 European 7-inch single

A. "Vart du än går" – 3:53
B. "Så snurrar din jord" – 3:32

 Swedish promotional CD single

 "Vart du än går" – 4:00

Credits and personnel 

 Niklas Strömstedt – songwriter, producer, vocals, arranger
 Bernard Löhr – producer, arranger, engineering

Credits and personnel adopted from the Om! album and 7-inch single liner notes.

Charts

References

External links 

 

1990 songs
1990 singles
Niklas Strömstedt songs
Polar Music singles
Songs written by Niklas Strömstedt
Swedish-language songs
Warner Music Group singles